Wiqu (Quechua twisted, bent, crooked, also spelled Hueco) is a mountain in the Paryaqaqa or Waruchiri mountain range in the Andes of Peru, about  high. It is located in the Lima Region, Huarochirí Province, Quinti District, and in the Yauyos Province, Tanta District. Wiqu lies southwest of Paryaqaqa and northeast of Parya Chaka.

References

Mountains of Peru
Mountains of Lima Region